Energy in Bahrain describes energy and electricity production, consumption and import in Bahrain. Baharain is net energy exporter.

Primary energy use was in Bahrain in 2009 110 TWh and 139 TWh per million persons and in 2008 107 TWh and 139 TWh/million people.

Overview

Oil 
Bahrain was the first place on the Arabian side of the Persian Gulf where oil was discovered. The First Oil Well, Bahrain situated below Jebel Dukhan has operated since 1932. It was operated by Bahrain Petroleum Company.

Business
Bahrain Petroleum Company (BAPCO) wholly owned by the government of Bahrain, is a fully integrated oil company.

Banagas is a large natural gas company.

See also 

 List of power stations in Bahrain

References